The Sun Never Sets is a 1939 American drama film directed by Rowland V. Lee and starring Douglas Fairbanks Jr., Basil Rathbone and Barbara O'Neil.

Plot
The Randolph family have a tradition of working in the British colonial service. Clive comes home from a mission in the Gold Coast of Africa accompanied by his wife Helen. He discovers his younger brother John, who is in love with Phyllis is not keen on following in his footsteps.

John is persuaded to try colonial service by his grandfather Sir John. John goes to the Gold Coast. He is accompanied by Clive who has been sent to investigate the source of a series of radio broadcasts that are sewing unrest throughout the world. These may be linked to Hugo Zurof, a man plotting to rule the world.

Clive leaves his pregnant wife Helen behind to go on a mission. Zurof tricks John into calling his brother back, causing Clive to be sent home in disgrace, despite the fact that Clive and Helen's child dies in childbirth.

John goes to Zurof's base and infiltrates it by pretending to be drunk. He manages to broadcast a code to his family. Clive leads a bombing mission to destroy the base. John survives it. Zurof and his men are killed.

Cast

Production
The film had been in development and Universal "on and off" for three years. Eventually Rowland V. Lee was assigned to direct and Basil Rathbone to star. (The two men had just made Son of Frankenstein together.) In February Douglas Fairbanks Jr. signed to co star.

The script was written by W.P. Lipscomb who said the film wanted to pay tribute to the British colonial service.
We attacked it by telling the story of one family, typical of hundreds of families who devote their lives to "the service." We show human beings and human emotions involved in affairs greater than themselves., and watch how they react. ' They are not conscious heroes; they make bad mistakes and cause intense suffering- If they worry through, it is by keeping their sense of humour in desperate circumstances and trusting that doing one's best, although one can't see the end in sight, may sometimes bring unexpected results. That is a trait common to all people in "the service" and is particularly true of Englishmen whose ability to take on a big job, face difficulties and meet them with good humour when 'things go badly, is accepted as one of the finest traditions of their national character.
Filming began 13 March 1939. Lipscomb was a friend of Virginia Field and wrote her into the movie.

Douglas Fairbanks Jr. says C Aubrey Smith walked up to him on the first day of filming and said, "Rotten title. It already has set."

Reception
Fairbanks Jr. said the film "did nothing at the bo [box office] because Americans were realizing we'd soon be at war."

References

Bibliography
 Dick, Bernard F. The Star-Spangled Screen: The American World War II Film. University Press of Kentucky, 2015.

External links

The Sun Never Sets at Letterbox DVD
The Sun Never Sets at TCMDB

1939 films
American drama films
1939 drama films
Films directed by Rowland V. Lee
Universal Pictures films
Films set in England
Films set in Africa
American black-and-white films
Films scored by Frank Skinner
1930s English-language films
1930s American films